Nick or Nicholas Baxter may refer to:
 Nick Baxter (rugby union), English rugby union player
 Nick Baxter (rower) (Nicholas Baxter), Australian rower
 Nick Baxter (sport shooter) (Nicholas James Baxter), English sport shooter
 Nicholas (Nick) Baxter, founder of Scottish charity Cornerstone

See also